Alberto Jorge Rodrigues de Matos (26 August 1945 – 28 January 2021) was a Portuguese sprinter. He competed in the men's 4 × 400 metres relay at the 1972 Summer Olympics.

References

External links
 

1945 births
2021 deaths
Athletes (track and field) at the 1972 Summer Olympics
Portuguese male sprinters
Portuguese male hurdlers
Olympic athletes of Portugal
Athletes from Lisbon